The 2001 National Indoor Football League season was the first season of the National Indoor Football League (NIFL). The league champions were the Mississippi Fire Dogs, who defeated the Wyoming Cavalry in Indoor Bowl I.

Standings

 Green indicates clinched playoff berth
 Purple indicates division champion
 Grey indicates best league record

Playoffs

See also
 List of NIFL seasons

External links
 2001 NIFL season stats

National Indoor Football League seasons
National League Football League